18 Vayasu (English: 18 years old) is a 2012 Indian Tamil psychological thriller film written and directed by R. Panneerselvam.The films stars Johnny and Gayathrie in lead roles. The music is by Charles Bosco.

Synopsis
Karthik, a mentally unstable man, has never received love and affection from anyone. Due to his illness, whenever he is depressed, he starts behaving like an animal that he sights first.

Plot
Karthik (Johnny Chakravarthy) develops a psychological disorder after seeing his father commit suicide. He displays animalistic behavior whenever he is anxious. As he grows up, he meets Gayathri (Gayathrie), an orphan. Gayathri is constantly harassed by her caretaker, whereas, Karthik is ill-treated by his mother (Yuvarani). This is due to her life with her paramour, which affects him a lot. One day, Karthik kills his mother. Gayathri is shocked and decides to end the relationship between Karthik, who runs away, fearing the law. Whether Karthik succeeds in winning back Gayathri's love is what the rest of the film is about.

Cast

Critical reception
Vivek Ramz of in.com wrote "Even though Director Paneer Selvam has a new premise, he lets it go loose with lot of loopholes in the script. He has tried to make the offbeat theme into a mainstream one and failed miserably in doing the same." Rohit Ramachandran of Nowrunning.com said of the film "18 Vayasu, just like its protagonist, is on the brink of falling apart." K.R. Manigandan of The Hindu claimed that the film misses its mark.

References

External links
 

Films shot in Madurai
2012 psychological thriller films
2012 films
2010s Tamil-language films
Indian psychological thriller films